Craig Easton is a British photographer who lives in The Wirral and works on long-term social documentary projects that deal with the representation of communities in the North of England. He has made work about women working in the UK fish processing industry; about the inter-generational nature of poverty and economic hardship in Northern England; about social deprivation, housing, unemployment and immigration in Blackburn; and about how the situation in which young people throughout the UK live, influences their aspirations.

Easton's Fisherwomen has been published as a book and shown in solo exhibitions at Montrose Museum and Hull Maritime Museum. The group project he organised, Sixteen, was exhibited all over the UK in 2019/20. He has been overall winner of Travel Photographer of the Year, and awarded Photographer of the Year at the Sony World Photography Awards. His work is held in the collections of Hull Maritime Museum, Salford University and the University of St Andrews.

Craig Easton: Is Anybody Listening? is showing at Open Eye Gallery in Liverpool until 26 February 2023.

Early life and education
Easton was born in Edinburgh and grew up in Liverpool. He studied Physics at the University of Salford in the 1980s.

Life and work
He began his photography career working as a photojournalist at The Independent newspaper in the early 1990s. For an article in 1992, Easton made black and white photographs of the Williams family in Blackpool that "exposed Thatcherism's legacy of child poverty." In 1997, he left The Independent and pursued more long-term photography projects.

Fisherwomen, made between 2013 and at least 2017 using a large format film camera, references the early social documentary photography of David Octavius Hill and Robert Adamson. In 1843 Hill and Adamson photographed the Newhaven fishwives who processed caught fish. Easton's project follows the historical trail of itinerant workers who followed the traditional herring fleet, from Unst in Shetland to Great Yarmouth in Norfolk. Fisherwomen documents, in colour, the connection between previous generations and contemporary workers, still largely women, now almost all working indoors in processing factories and smokehouses.

From 2016 to 2020 he again found and photographed three generations of the Williams family in the North of England, in a series in colour about the inter-generational nature of poverty and economic hardship.

Since 2019 Easton has been documenting the neighbourhood of Bank Top in Blackburn. His black and white portraits, and occasional landscapes, made within about a 500 m radius, highlight social deprivation, housing, unemployment and immigration. The work is accompanied by text by local writer and researcher Abdul Aziz Hafiz. The series is part of an initiative by Blackburn Museum and Art Gallery, called Kick Down the Barriers, in which artists and writers collaborate with residents of Blackburn in representing their community. The initiative is a response to a 2007 BBC Panorama TV programme that claimed Blackburn was "one of the most segregated towns in Britain". This view has persisted in media representation of the town ever since, but locals refute it. Easton is using an 8×10 large format film camera for the work. It was published as a book in 2022.

Sixteen was a group photography project conceived and led by Easton where by he and fifteen other photographers collaborated with 16-year-olds from various social backgrounds all around the UK. The young people responded to questions about what it means to be sixteen. "The work challenges the notion of meritocracy and examines how social background, ethnicity, gender, location, education, health etc all influence what young people think they can achieve in life." The other photographers were Linda Brownlee, David Copeland, Lottie Davies, Jillian Edelstein, Stuart Freedman, Sophie Gerrard, Kalpesh Lathigra, Roy Mehta, Christopher Nunn, Kelly O'Brien, Kate Peters, Michelle Sank, Abbie Trayler-Smith, Simon Roberts and Robert C Brady. The work was shown in galleries and outdoors all over the UK in 2019/20.

Publications

Publications by Easton
Fisherwomen. Ten O'Clock, 2020. Edition of 500 copies. Portfolio format.
Bank Top. London: Gost, 2022. . With an essay and field notes by Abdul Aziz Hafiz.

Publications with others
52 Weekends by the Sea. Virgin, 2010. With Brigid Benson. .

Awards
2012: Overall winner, Travel Photographer of the Year, UK, with 2 photographs from Sixteen
2017: Winner, FC Barcelona Photo Awards, Barcelona, Spain, with a photograph from Sixteen
2017: Finalist, Taylor Wessing Photographic Portrait Prize, National Portrait Gallery, London
2021: Photographer of the Year, Sony World Photography Awards, London. A $25,000 prize.
2021: Winner, Portraiture category, Sony World Photography Awards, London

Exhibitions

Solo exhibitions
Fisherwomen, Montrose Museum, Montrose, Angus, Scotland, 2019; Hull Maritime Museum, Hull, England, 2019
Craig Easton: Is Anybody Listening?, Open Eye Gallery, Liverpool, 13 January – 26 February 2023.

Group exhibitions
2017/18: Taylor Wessing Photographic Portrait Prize exhibition, National Portrait Gallery, London, with 2 photographs from Sixteen
Sixteen, HOME, Manchester, 2019; Format Festival, Derby Market Hall, Derby, 2019; Open Eye Gallery, Liverpool, 2019; Coed Pella, Colwyn Bay, during Northern Eye festival, 2019; Ellesmere Port Library, Ellesmere Port, 2019; outside in Lerwick, Shetland, 2019; outside Parkside Gallery, Birmingham City University, 2019; Belfast Exposed, Belfast, 2019; outside in Trongate, Glasgow, 2020; Photofusion, London
Kick Down the Barriers, Blackburn Museum and Art Gallery, 2020. Included Bank Top, photographs by Easton and text by Abdul Aziz Hafiz.

Collections
Easton's work is held in the following permanent collection:
Hull Maritime Museum, Hull: prints from Sixteen (as of April 2021)
Salford University Art Collection, Salford: 2 prints from Sixteen (as of April 2021)
University of St Andrews Library Special Collections, St Andrews: a portfolio of work from Fisherwomen

References

External links

Easton talks about using a large format film camera (4 mins video)

Social documentary photographers
British portrait photographers
British photojournalists
21st-century British photographers
20th-century British photographers
Photographers from Liverpool
Alumni of the University of Salford
Place of birth missing (living people)
Year of birth missing (living people)
Living people